A list of American films released in 1962.
Lawrence of Arabia won the Academy Award for Best Picture.


Top-grossing films (U.S.)

source: https://web.archive.org/web/20080907071824/http://www.boxofficereport.com/database/1962.shtml

A-B

C-G

H-M

N-S

T-Z

See also
 1962 in the United States

External links

1962 films at the Internet Movie Database
List of 1962 box office number-one films in the United States

1962
Films
Lists of 1962 films by country or language